Steffen Skår Størseth (born 26 April 1975) is a Norwegian competition rower and Olympic medalist.

He received a silver medal in double sculls at the 1996 Summer Olympics in Atlanta, together with Kjetil Undset.

References

1975 births
Living people
Norwegian male rowers
Olympic rowers of Norway
Olympic silver medalists for Norway
Rowers at the 1996 Summer Olympics
Rowers at the 2000 Summer Olympics
Olympic medalists in rowing
Medalists at the 1996 Summer Olympics
World Rowing Championships medalists for Norway